Harbinger is the first novel in the Star Trek: Vanguard series concerning the Starbase 47, otherwise known as Vanguard.

Synopsis
The U.S.S. Enterprise is damaged after traveling to the edge of the galaxy. They are passing through the Taurus Reach and are surprised to find a new Federation facility, Starbase 47 a.k.a. Vanguard. Captain James T. Kirk is puzzled at this place for many reasons, including it being so near the xenophobic Tholian Assembly. Kirk has his ship dock for repairs.

The Tholian Assembly, the Orion Syndicate, and the Klingon Empire all believe there is much more to the establishment of this odd new starbase and there is.

See also
Harbinger (Star Trek: Enterprise)
Star Trek: Deep Space Nine: Harbinger (1996 video game)

External links

Author's Annotations

2005 American novels
Star Trek: Vanguard novels
Novels by David Alan Mack